The Mycobacterial Phage PBI1 Gp36 Holin (Gp36 Hol) Family (TC# 1.E.39) consists of a single protein, Gp36 of Mycobacterial phage PBI1 (TC# 1.E.39.1.1) identified by Castalao et al. (2012). Gp36 is 116 amino acyl residues (aas) in length and exhibits 2 transmembrane segments (TMSs). While annotated as a holin, this protein has not been functionally characterized.

See also 
 Holin
 Lysin
 Transporter Classification Database

Further reading

References 

Protein families
Membrane proteins
Transmembrane proteins
Transmembrane transporters
Transport proteins
Integral membrane proteins
Holins